The European Association for Investors in Non-Listed Real Estate Vehicles (INREV), incorporated in 2002, is a non-profit association located in the Netherlands that provides services and education for investors interested in the European non-listed real estate fund market. 
.

INREV states its goal is to improve the accessibility of non-listed real estate by promoting greater transparency, accessibility, professionalism and standards of best practice. As a pan-European body it represents a platform for the sharing and dissemination of knowledge on the non-listed real estate fund market.

INREV develops research reports and snapshots on key industry topics, analytic tools for performance analysis, benchmarking, fees analysis, and comparison, guidelines and professional standards, public affairs updates on regulations affecting the industry, events, training courses and webinars, and an online members directory.

Research
INREV publishes over a dozen reports annually on topics of interest to investors, fund managers, and financial advisors. Key research publications include: Investment Intentions survey, an annual investment intentions survey to cover European non-listed real estate funds; Fund Managers Survey, which looks at the total real estate assets under management (AUM) for individual fund managers; and, Management Fees and Terms Study, which includes an overview of the fee structures and fee levels of European non-listed real estate funds, and a comparison study which compares Europe with Asia and the US.

Industry data
The INREV Index is a performance index for European non-listed real estate funds investing 90% or more in Europe, and is listed on Bloomberg. The INREV Index measures annual Net Asset Value based performance on a quarterly and annual basis.

INREV's Vehicles Universe provides an overview of all vehicles active in the three areas covered: European Direct Vehicles, Asian Direct Vehicles, and Fund of Funds for Europe and Asia. The databases comprise key characteristics for all real estate vehicles like the strategy, size, allocation and contact details as well as other characteristics.

Professional standards
The INREV Guidelines provide fund managers and institutional investors with an integrated set of principles, guidelines and recommendations (including tools and examples) for governance and information provision in relation to non-listed real estate vehicles. Supporting the INREV Guidelines are: due diligence questionnaires (DDQ) for fund managers, and for fund of funds and multi-managers, to streamline fund information ahead of a fund’s launch; corporate governance self-assessment tool, to provide guidance on corporate governance topics such as accountability, transparency and alignment of interest; and, the reporting self-assessment tool, to provide fund managers with an overview of any weaknesses within their fund, and allows investors to see how well funds are conforming to relevant guidelines.

Other professional standards tools include: Standard Data Delivery Sheet (SDDS) for quarterly reporting, which captures the most essential quantitative data investors say they would like to receive from their managers on a quarterly basis; and, a standard non-disclosure agreement (NDA) to replace the wide variety of NDAs currently being used in the industry, decreasing the time required to review the various NDAs and increase overall efficiency.

Public affairs
INREV prepares briefing papers on a range of regulatory issues affecting the non-listed real estate industry, such as AIFMD and Solvency II, makes available consultation papers from the European Commission and other regulators, and also collaborates with other agencies to develop industry responses to public consultations, and more.

References

External links
 Official site

Non-profit organisations based in the Netherlands